Dialogues is an album by Kenny Davern and Ken Peplowski that was released by Arbors Records in 2008.

Track listing 
 "If Dreams Come True" – 7:16
 "Diner" – 5:47
 "I Can't Believe That You're in Love with Me" – 5:40
 "Comes Love" – 9:16
 "Should I?" – 7:14
 "Sometimes I'm Happy" – 4:10
 "High Society" – 4:49
 "Crazy Rhythm" – 7:02
 "Nobody Else But Me" – 4:36
 "Muskrat Samba" – 5:40

Personnel
 Kenny Davern – clarinet
 Ken Peplowski – clarinet, tenor saxophone
 Howard Alden – guitar, banjo
 James Chirillo – guitar, banjo
 Nicki Parrott – double bass
 Tony DeNicola – drums

References

2007 albums
Kenny Davern albums
Ken Peplowski albums
Dixieland revival albums
Dixieland albums
Swing albums
Arbors Records albums